Devon Achane (born October 13, 2001) is an American football running back for the Texas A&M Aggies.

Early years
Achane attended Thurgood Marshall High School in Missouri City, Texas. During his career, he rushed for 2,097 yards with 38 touchdowns. He also ran track in high school and was the 2020 Texas Gatorade Boys Track & Field Athlete of the Year. Achane committed to Texas A&M University to play college football.

College career
As a true freshman at Texas A&M in 2020, Achane played in eight games as a backup to Isaiah Spiller. He rushed for 364 yards on 43 carries with four touchdowns. He was named the MVP of the 2021 Orange Bowl after rushing for 140 yards and two touchdowns.

Achane returned as Spiller's backup in 2021. Following a 96-yard kick return for a touchdown over then-ranked No. 1 Alabama, Achane SEC Special Teams Player of the Week honors.

References

External links
Texas A&M Aggies bio

Living people
Players of American football from Texas
American football running backs
Texas A&M Aggies football players
2001 births